"Stop Sign" is the third single released from former Five member Abs Breen's debut solo album, Abstract Theory. The single found fair success, peaking at No. 10 in the UK and No. 53 in Australia. The song samples "Stop Sign" by Mel Wynn.

Track listing
 UK CD single 
 "Stop Sign" - 2:54
 "Music for Cars" - 3:09
 "Stop That Bitchin'" - 3:10
 "Stop Sign" [Video] - 2:54

 UK DVD single 
 "Stop Sign" [Video] - 2:54
 "Stop Sign" [Bimbo Jones Remix] - 7:06
 "Stop Sign" [NuSkool Brakez Remix] - 5:44
 "Stop Sign" [Making Of The Video] - 2:00

Weekly charts

References

2002 songs
2003 singles
Abz Love songs
Song recordings produced by Richard Stannard (songwriter)
Songs written by Abz Love